is a Japanese anime television series produced by Trigger. The series follows vagrant schoolgirl Ryuko Matoi on her search for her father's killer which brings her into violent conflict with Satsuki Kiryuin, the iron-willed student council president of Honnouji Academy, and her mother Ragyo Kiryuin's fashion empire. Ryuko, Satsuki, and others obtain martial arts superpowers from their clothes, which appear to have a will of their own.

The series is Trigger's first original anime television project, directed by Hiroyuki Imaishi and written by Kazuki Nakashima, both of whom had previously worked together on Gurren Lagann in 2007 and would go on to work on Promare in 2019. Kill la Kill was broadcast in Japan on MBS' Animeism programming block between October 2013 and March 2014. An original video animation (OVA) was released as a 25th episode in September 2014. A manga adaptation by Ryō Akizuki began serialization in Kadokawa Shoten's Young Ace magazine from October 2013 to March 2015. A video game adaptation, titled Kill la Kill the Game: IF, was released in July 2019, with slight deviations to the main storyline of the anime.

In North America, Aniplex of America licensed the anime for a simulcast with a home video release starting in July 2014. The series premiered in the United States on Adult Swim's Toonami block in February 2015.

Synopsis

Setting
 is a fictional high school situated in Tokyo Bay, Japan, on the island of Honnō City. The school is dominated by its fearsome student council led by their president Satsuki Kiryuin. Honnouji Academy and Honnō City feature a stratified class structure, in which higher-ranked students are allowed to obtain more powerful Goku Uniforms. This in turn affects the social status of the student's family.

Plot

Ryuko Matoi, a vagrant transfer student armed with a scissor-shaped longsword that can cut Goku Uniforms, arrives to Honnō City to find the murderer of her father Isshin Matoi. Her search leads her to enroll in Honnouji Academy, a militaristic high school ruled by the student council president Satsuki Kiryuin and her Elite Four through the power of a fabric called Life Fibers. Following a failed attempt to challenge Satsuki on her first day, Ryuko stumbled across a sentient sailor uniform in an underground complex beneath the ruins of her father's home. She names the outfit "Senketsu", later learning that he is a pure Life Fiber clothing called a  that increases her abilities while transformed. Satsuki responds by donning her family's Kamui Junketsu at great risk to her well-being, accepting Ryuko's challenge if she can defeat the two-star student club presidents that would target her. Ryuko is joined by her hyperactive classmate Mako Mankanshoku, a no-star student who lets Ryuko move in with her impoverished family, and her homeroom teacher Aikuro Mikisugi, who is actually an undercover agent of the anti-Life Fiber paramilitary organization .

Ryuko later gets her chance to confront Satsuki when she reorganizes their student council through a battle royal and king-of-the-hill event known as the Naturals Election, requiring her to first defeat each member of Satsuki's Elite Four. But the event is interrupted by Nui Harime, a member of the global  run by the academy's director and Satsuki's mother, Ragyo Kiryuin. Harime reveals herself as Isshin's killer while revealing the other Scissor Blade, provoking Ryuko into a rage that causes an unstable fusion between her and Senketsu, which nearly kills her. She is only stopped and defused from her Kamui when Mako intervenes. Ryuko becomes reluctant to wear Senketsu soon after while learning that Satsuki used her to refine the Goku Uniforms for the upcoming Tri-City Schools Raid. Harime, having been banned from the academy, tricks Ryuko into putting Senketsu back on before shredding the Kamui to pieces, driven off by Satsuki before she could kill Ryuko. As Satsuki commences the Tri-City Schools Raid to annex the remaining independent schools in Kansai, with its actual purpose to locate and destroy Nudist Beach's base, Ryuko follows to retrieve the pieces of Senketsu's body that Satsuki gave to her subordinates.

Ryuko succeeds in restoring Senketsu but fails to stop Satsuki's agenda, learning from Mikisugi that her father founded Nudist Beach and created Senketsu from Ryuko's DNA to fight the Life Fibers, revealed to be parasitic aliens that played a factor in humanity's evolution to later feed. Ryuko and Nudist Beach storm the Honnouji Academy festival held in Ragyo's honor before she awakens the Life Fibers, only to witness Satsuki attacking her mother while revealing her true goal has been to destroy the Life Fiber threat to avenge her father, along with her younger sister who died from being experimented on by Ragyo. But Satsuki's plan falls apart when Ragyo, revealed to be a human/Life Fiber hybrid and also ordered Isshin's murder, captures her while ordering the Covers to consume every human present. Nudist Beach, the Mankanshoku family, and Satsuki's inner circle are forced to retreat while Ragyo reveals Ryuko as Satsuki's presumed-dead younger sister who was discarded by her, having been raised by her ex-husband Sōichirō Kiryuin under the guise of Isshin and hidden away. Ryuko goes into a coma shortly after, as Ragyo forcibly removed Ryuko's heart from her chest to confirm their familial ties. 

A month later, Ragyo and the Life Fibers have devastated Japan as the Elite Four and Nudist Beach rescue both Satsuki and Mako. But a bitter Ryuko, having woken up from her coma and abandoned her friends under the belief that she is a monster, is brainwashed and bonded to Junketsu to pursue them. But Satsuki, Mako, and Senketsu manage to free Ryuko as she gains the other Scissor Blade and amputates Harime's arms with Junketsu is modified to be more subservient to Satsuki. Ryuko and Satsuki proceed to intercept Ragyo before she and the Primordial Life Fiber, the source of all Life Fibers, can reach Honnouji Academy to launch a command signal to a satellite for all Life Fibers to cover the planet and destroy it as part of their life cycle. But Harime completes Shinra-Kōketsu with Ragyo's secretary Rei Hououmaru offered as a sacrifice to activate it, enabling Ragyo to command all pure-Life Fibers with only Ryuko and Senketsu unaffected due to being hybrids. 

The heroes destroy the transmitter and extract Rei from Shinra-Kōketsu, only for Ragyo to restore its power by absorbing Harime and the Primordial Life Fiber while ascending to space to manually issue the command. But Ryuko pursues her mother after everyone offers their Goku Uniforms to power up Senketsu, managing to have Senketsu absorb Shinra-Kōketsu to rescind the order. Defeated, a defiant Ragyo spitefully commits suicide while promising that the Life Fibers will one day attack Earth again. Despite being victorious, Senketsu begins breaking down from absorbing Shinra-Kōketsu and uses the last of his strength to ensure Ryuko safely returns to Earth, giving his life in the process. 

In the follow-up OVA episode, set two weeks after the battle with Ragyo, Rei Hououmaru uses leftover Life Fibers to create doppelgängers of Satsuki and the Elite Four in Junketsu and their original Goku Uniforms to disrupt Honnouji Academy's graduation ceremony and avenge Ragyo. But the clones are defeated while Satsuki convinces Rei to abandon her struggle as Ryuko uses the Scissor Blades to finish off Honnouji Academy. The school is shut down during the sinking of Honnō City, and everyone leaves to live out normal lives, with Satsuki having the students, Elite Four, Iori, Rei, and Mitsuzo give a final salute to the school while Ryuko departs with Mako and her family.

Development
The anime television project, directed by Hiroyuki Imaishi at his animation studio, Trigger, was first teased in the March 2013 issue of Kadokawa Shoten's Newtype magazine released on February 7, 2013. Kill la Kill was officially announced on May 8, 2013, with scripts written by Kazuki Nakashima and character designs by Sushio.

Release

Broadcast
Kill la Kill aired in Japan on MBS' Animeism programming block between October 4, 2013, and March 28, 2014. It also aired on TBS, CBC and BS-TBS.

The series is licensed in North America by Aniplex of America, who simulcasted the series on Daisuki, and streamed it on Crunchyroll and Hulu. The series aired on Adult Swim's Toonami block in the United States from February 8 to August 2, 2015. and premiered on Viceland UK on October 16, 2017.

In Italy, the streaming rights of the series were acquired by Dynit, which announced the acquisition, with reservation, at its conference at Lucca Comics 2017. The acquisition became successful on December 22 of the same year and Dynit published the series on VVVVID on February 6, 2018. Subsequently, the Italian dub of the series was added to Netflix on September 1, 2018.

Home media

Japanese
The video release on Blu-ray Disc and DVD began on January 8, 2014. Soundtrack CDs are included with the first and fifth volumes, making-of documentary DVDs are included with the third, seventh, and ninth volumes, and drama CDs are included with the second, fourth, sixth, and eighth volumes. An original video animation episode was released as part of the ninth volume on September 3, 2014.

English
The series was released in five BD/DVD volumes in North America. The first volume was released on July 15, 2014, in limited edition BD/DVD combo packs including soundtrack CDs, as well as standard Blu-ray Disc and DVD releases. At Anime Expo 2014 held in Los Angeles, Aniplex premiered the first English dub episode, and hosted a performance by theme song singer Eir Aoi, and a panel with script writer Kazuki Nakashima, director Sushio, producer Yosuke Toba, and voice actresses Ami Koshimizu and Ryoka Yuzuki.

The series is licensed in the United Kingdom and France by Anime Limited, and was simulcast on Wakanim, later receiving a digital release on Netflix. The series was released on Blu-ray and DVD in three Collector's Edition sets. The first set was originally slated for a release date on December 8, 2014, but was later moved to November 17, 2014. Subsequently, the release was pushed forward a further two weeks, with the first release being available in the UK on November 3, 2014, while the Blu-ray version was pushed back to December 1, 2014.

In Australia and New Zealand, the series is licensed by Madman Entertainment, who simulcasted the series on Madman Screening Room, and later released the series digitally on AnimeLab. The series was released on Blu-ray and DVD, and mirrored the release pattern of the North American releases. The first volume was released on October 15, 2014.

Soundtrack

Music for the series is composed by Hiroyuki Sawano. Aoi's song "Sanbika" was used as an image song to accompany climactic events in episodes 3, 7, 11 and 23.

The first soundtrack album was published on December 25, 2013. Aniplex USA also released the CD on January 17, 2014. It features 18 tracks, including six vocal songs performed in English and German. The background music tracks feature titles that are typographical variants of "Kill la Kill".

The second soundtrack album was released in Japan as part of the fifth DVD/Blu-ray disc set on May 7, 2014. It also features  versions of the vocal tracks from the first album, among other background music.

Track listing

Other media

Manga
A manga adaptation illustrated by Ryō Akizuki began serialization in Kadokawa Shoten's Young Ace magazine on October 4, 2013. The series ended with the seventeenth chapter on February 4, 2015, and was compiled into three tankōbon volumes between December 2013 and March 4, 2015. Udon Entertainment has licensed the manga adaptation.

Video game
A video game adaptation titled  was announced at the Anime Expo between July 5–8, 2018. The game was published by Arc System Works and developed by A+ Games, who developed Little Witch Academia: Chamber of Time, also based on another anime by Trigger. It was released on PlayStation 4, Nintendo Switch, and PC in Japan on July 25, 2019, and in North America and Europe the next day. In Europe, the game was published by PQube. Kill la Kill the Game: IF also received an English dub. The game's storyline takes place during the events of episode 3, depicting Satsuki being placed by Junketsu in artificial reality that follows the anime storyline with slight deviations.

Reception
Kill la Kill was met with mostly positive reviews. Eliot Gay of Japanator called the "uniquely fun, even gripping" series "a reminder of how fun and creative anime can be at its best", despite the readily apparent budget constraints. Kat Bailey of IGN, describing the series as "magical girl anime on speed", noted that its over-the-top absurdity was part of its charm. Joseph Luster of Otaku USA described the series's concept as "mostly straightforward setup for revenge and shonen-style 'stronger! STRONGER!' battle progression", but praised its execution.  Richard Eisenbeis of Kotaku appreciated the series for "perfectly mixing comedy and action", its pacing, internal consistency and over-the-top straightforward adaptation of standard action anime tropes.

The animation of fight scenes and character movements, as well as the "keen selection of music", were particularly praised by Robert Frazer of UK Anime Network, The site selected it as the 2013 UK Anime Network Awards winner in the "Best streaming anime" category. Carl Kimlinger of Anime News Network also appreciated the inventive and funny animation and the series's "retro shonen action pushed to ... loony, hyperactive extremes". Michael Logarta of GMA News Online likewise noted the "superb pacing", to-the-point storytelling and well-realized characters in the series's "whirlwind of gorgeous visuals, story, and unfettered insanity".

Kill la Kill won multiple prizes during the 4th Newtype Anime Awards, including Best Character Design (Sushio), Best Script (Kazuki Nakashima), Best Sound, and Best Picture (TV Broadcast). It placed second for Best Theme Song ("Sirius"), Best Director (Hiroyuki Imaishi) and Best Studio (Trigger). In the Best Mascot category, Senketsu placed third and Guts placed ninth. In Best Character (female), Ryuko placed second, and Mako placed third. The anime was part of the Jury Selections of the 18th Japan Media Arts Festival in the Animation category.

Notes

References

External links
  
 
 

2013 anime television series debuts
2013 manga
Action anime and manga
Anime composed by Hiroyuki Sawano
Anime with original screenplays
Animeism
Aniplex
Coming-of-age anime and manga 
Experimental medical treatments in fiction
Fiction about mind control
Kadokawa Shoten manga
Magical girl anime and manga
Mainichi Broadcasting System original programming
Post-apocalyptic anime and manga
Fiction about rebellions
Anime and manga about revenge
School life in anime and manga
Surreal comedy anime and manga
Seinen manga
Sentient objects in fiction
Studio Trigger
TBS Television (Japan) original programming
Toonami